Akyar Dam is a dam in Ankara Province, Turkey, built between 1996 and 2001.

See also
List of dams and reservoirs in Turkey

External links
DSI

Dams in Ankara Province
Dams completed in 2001